The 2003–04 EHF Women's Cup Winners' Cup was the twenty-eighth edition of EHF's competition for women's handball national cup champions. It returned to an autumn to spring calendar three years later, running from October 10, 2003, to May 21, 2004. The format was also altered, breaking the Rounds of 32 and 16 into three preliminary rounds, with the four remaining teams playing against the third-placed teams in the Champions League's group stage in the quarterfinals.

The final confronted two teams coming from the Champions League, with 2002 EHF Cup champion Ikast Bording beating 8-times Champions League champion Hypo Niederösterreich, overcoming an away loss by a 9-goals margin, to become the first Danish team to win the Cup Winners' Cup.

Results

First preliminary round

Final stages

References

Women's EHF Cup Winners' Cup
2003 in handball
2004 in handball